The U3 is an underground line in Nuremberg. The line was opened on 14 June 2008. The number of stations is 14. The termini are Nordwestring and Großreuth. U 3 trains are run driverless and have been since the opening of the line. U3 shares part of its route (from Rathenauplatz to Rothenburger Straße) with the older U2.

History
While the original plans of the U-Bahn network to be all called for at least three main trunk lines on their entire dedicated corridors, financial constraints and the decision not to abandon the Tramway network as had been planned at the time the U-Bahn began construction, made it clear after the construction of U2 that a third trunk line would be economical only if the Tram network was abandoned after all. A political consensus emerged to keep the Tram network, but still expand the U-Bahn system, if a bit slower and more moderately. Therefore, it was decided to use parts of existing tunnels for the U3 instead of building an entire dedicated tunnel. However, as it was deemed impossible to reduce the frequency and the existing signalling system was at its limits along the line U2, the decision was taken to automate the existing line to allow for higher throughput. The new U3 thus opened as the first fully automated U-Bahn in Germany and has been fully driverless from its first day of commercial operations. The U2 was automated in the following two years whereas U1, the oldest and longest line in the system and the only one to operate outside the municipal boundaries of Nuremberg is still fully driver operated. U3 which forms a rough C-shape with both branches lying to the West of downtown has been extended twice on its northern branch, first in 2011 with the two new stations Kaublachplatz and Friedrich Ebert Platz and then in 2017 with the two new stations Klinikum Nord and Nordwestring. The 2011 extension of the northern branch of the U3 led to the - to date - last major permanent shutdown of service on part of the Nuremberg tramway network, as service thru Pirckheimer Straße was shut down (while the rails and overhead wiring remained as a backup in case of closures on other routes) due to the potential of one line "cannibalizing" the ridership of the other. An extension of the southern branch towards Großreuth was opened on 15 October 2020. Further extensions are under construction along the southern branch of U3.

Planned extensions
Out of all Nuremberg U-Bahn lines, U3 is the youngest and the only one with extensions currently under construction. After the northern branch reached an endpoint for the time being at Nordwestring in May 2017, construction is ongoing along the southern branch. An extension west towards Großreuth bei Schweinau was opened on 15 October 2020. Further extensions towards Kleinreuth bei Schweinau and Gebersdorf are already under construction. There is a longstanding plan to use part or all of the old Bibertbahn right of way for further extensions. An expansion of the Northern branch is not planned as of 2018 but variously debated and suggested politically.

Stations

Operations
During the rush hour peak, trains on U3 leave every 3 1/3 minutes (200 seconds) which overlaps with U2 to a 100-second headway between Rathenauplatz and Rothenburger Straße. There is no service at night (roughly between 1 AM and 5 AM) not even on weekends. A few trains beginning on the U3 branches (Nordwestring and Großreuth) are routed to the U2 branch instead (Röthenbach and Airport respectively) and vice versa.

Opening dates 
 28 January 1984: Plärrer ↔ Rothenburger Straße (as part of U2)
 23 September 1988: Plärrer ↔ Hauptbahnhof (as part of U2)
 24 September 1990: Hauptbahnhof ↔ Rathenauplatz (as part of U2)
 14 June 2008: Gustav-Adolf-Straße ↔ Rothenburger Straße (opening of U3)
 14 June 2008: Rathenauplatz ↔ Maxfeld (opening of U3)
 11 December 2011: Maxfeld ↔ Friedrich-Ebert-Platz
 22 May 2017: Friedrich Ebert Platz ↔ Nordwestring
 15 October 2020: Gustav-Adolf-Straße ↔ Großreuth bei Schweinau

Rolling stock
Due to having relied on automatic operation from day one, U3 has only ever had the VAG Class DT3 rolling stock, which was designed for automatic operation. The VAG Class G1 currently in use on U1 is capable of both automatic and manual operation and could in the future be used on U3 but isn't as of 2022.

See also

Nuremberg U-Bahn
U1 (Nuremberg U-Bahn)
U2 (Nuremberg U-Bahn)
Nuremberg S-Bahn
S1 (Nuremberg)
S2 (Nuremberg)
S3 (Nuremberg)
S4 (Nuremberg)

References

Nuremberg U-Bahn lines

de:U-Bahn Nürnberg#Liniennetz